Wang Qun (王群, Pinyin: Wáng Qún; 26 January 1960 – 3 January 2008) was a Chinese actor, film director, action choreographer and martial artist. He is best known for starring in a number of martial arts films in the 1980s and 1990s.

Wang won the 1987 Golden Eagle Award for Best Supporting Actor for the 1986 TV series Zhen San. He died in 2008 from a heart attack.

Filmography

Film

TV series

References

External links

 (same person)

20th-century Chinese male actors
21st-century Chinese male actors
Male actors from Beijing
Beijing Film Academy alumni
Chinese male film actors
Chinese male television actors
Chinese wushu practitioners
1960 births
2008 deaths